Mamitu Gashe is an Ethiopian surgeon who is a specialist in repairing obstetric fistula, and was named by the BBC in its 100 Women list of 2018. She had decided to become an obstetrics surgeon after almost dying during childbirth at the age of 16 in 1962.

Suffering from obstetric fistula, Gashe was brought to the Princess Tsehai Hospital that offered free surgery for the condition.

After receiving surgery, Gashe helped out by making beds and assisting Australian surgeon Catherine Hamlin and New Zealand surgeon Reginald Hamlin. She joined the Addis Ababa Fistula Hospital, founded by the Hamlins in 1974; initially, Gashe would hand Hamlin the requested medical implements. After a couple of years she started suturing and then moved on to undertake surgery. Hamlin trained her in how to repair fistulas, and she is now regarded as one of the institution's leading fistula surgeons, often training new post-graduate doctors. The work of Reginald and Catherine Hamlin, and Mamitu Gashe, was recognised by the Royal College of Surgeons of England (RCS) with the award of its Gold Medal.

The Addis Ababa Fistula Hospital often uses medical staff without formal qualifications. In 2007, the President of the RCS called Gashe "the forerunner of the non-medically qualified practitioner."

References

External links
 Healing and Hope: Inside the Addis Ababa Fistula Hospital Al Jazeera documentary, 2011.
 I trained to be a surgeon when I couldn’t read or write BBC Interview with Mamitu Gashe, 16 May 2019
 Mamitu: One of BBC’s 100 Women in 2018 Catherine Hamlin Fistula Foundation profile, 30 January 2019.
 

1940s births
Living people
BBC 100 Women
Ethiopian surgeons